Cumbum was one of the 294 Legislative Assembly constituencies of Andhra Pradesh state in India. It was in Prakasam district and was dissolved before the 2009 elections and most of its area is now in Giddalur (Assembly constituency).

History of the constituency
The Cumbum constituency was first created for the Madras state Legislative Assembly in 1952. It was dissolved in 1955 Elections due to paasing of the Delimitation Commission of 1952 was created due to the Delimitation of Parliamentary and Assembly Constituencies Order, 1951. Justice N Chandrasekhara Aiyar, a retired justice of the Supreme Court, was its chairman in 1953. After the passing of the States Reorganisation Act, 1956, it became a part of the new Andhra Pradesh Legislative Assembly. After the passing of the Delimitation of Parliamentary and Assembly Constituencies Order, 1976, its extent was the Cumbum and Ardhaveedu firkas in Giddalur
taluk; and Podili taluk (excluding Podili and Marripudi
firkas) and Thimmareddipalli firka in Kanigiri taluk.

It was not present now due to Delimitation of Parliamentary and Assembly Constituencies Order, 2008 and hence was defunct as of the 2009 Andhra Pradesh Legislative Assembly election.

Yerragondapalem Assembly constituency was newly formed as part of the Delimitation of Parliamentary and Assembly Constituencies Order, 2008 and active from the 2009 Andhra Pradesh Legislative Assembly election. after dissolving the Cumbum Assembly Constituency

Members of the Legislative assembly

Election results

Assembly elections 2004

Assembly elections 1999

Assembly elections 1994

Assembly elections 1989

Assembly elections 1985

Assembly elections 1983

Assembly elections 1978

Assembly elections 1952

See also
List of constituencies of the Andhra Pradesh Legislative Assembly
Prakasam district

References

Prakasam district
Former assembly constituencies of Andhra Pradesh